Phonogram may refer to:

 A sound recording – see Geneva Phonograms Convention
 Phonogram (comics), a comic book by Kieron Gillen and Jamie McKelvie
 Phonogram (linguistics), a grapheme which represents a phoneme or a combination of phonemes
 Phonogram Inc., a music label holding company which was launched in 1971
 A phonogram, the sound recording element of a phonorecord

See also
 Phonograph, a device for the mechanical recording and reproduction of sound
 Phonograph record
 Sound recording copyright symbol — ℗ stands for phonogram